Claudia Schmidt (born 26 April 1963) is a politician and educator from Austria who served as Member of 8th European Parliament from 2014 to 2019.

Personal life 
Schmidt was born in Salzburg where she also served as Mayor.

References 

1963 births
Living people
Women Members of the European Parliament
People from Salzburg
MEPs 2014–2019
21st-century Austrian politicians